Cesare Valle (17 June 1902 – 10 September 2000) was an Italian architect. His work was part of the architecture event in the art competition at the 1936 Summer Olympics.

References

External links
 Cesare Valle Sr Studio Valle Progettazioni

1902 births
2000 deaths
20th-century Italian architects
Olympic competitors in art competitions
Architects from Rome